"Ooh I Do" is the fifth single released by Lynsey de Paul on 17 May 1974 and her only single released on the Warner Bros. label, after moving there from MAM Records. Co-written by de Paul and Barry Blue, this Phil Spector-ish song with a nod to the style of the Roy Wood/Wizzard sound, conveys the angst about parents not believing in a teenage love affair represented a change of style for de Paul, who also produced the recording. De Paul performed the song on TV shows in Spain and Germany, however, her only UK performance was for Top of the Pops, but this was never shown because of industrial action at the BBC. De Paul re-recorded the song for this episode and this version was released on the BBC Transcription Services album, Top Of The Pops-495, which also featured an interview conducted by Brian Matthews.

History
Together with "Sugar Me" it was her biggest hit in Japan. In the UK, some copies were mis-pressed with the B-side label appearing as "Ten Years After on Strawberry Jam" by The Scaffold, that also appeared on the Warner Bros label, although the track that plays is "Nothing Really Lasts Forever" (K 16400), also sung, composed and produced by de Paul. According to Barry Blue, "Ooh I Do" is the only song he and de Paul co-write that they fell out over - Blue wanted to release his version of the song as a single but de Paul recorded it first.

Chart performance
It was a hit in the UK Singles Chart (number 25), and in corresponding charts in Belgium, the Netherlands and Brazil. It reached number 13 on the Capital countdown chart and number 20 on the NME chart. It was ranked 50th best single of 1974 by Joepie, a Flemish hit list that was published in the youth magazine, Joepie.

Other recordings
The song has been covered by other artists, notably Barry Blue, albeit it with different lyrics; as well as the Japanese artists Kojima Mayumi, on the album, Jive Bunny Project – Stepping - Spectre Sounds, as well as on her 2015 album Cover Songs, and GML (Girl Meets Love) on their CD GML Meets Union Jack.

Chart performance

References

External links
 

Lynsey de Paul songs
Warner Records singles
Songs written by Lynsey de Paul
Songs written by Barry Blue
Year of song missing
1974 singles